Djarkhan is a former village located in southwestern Sakha Republic, Russia. In 1957, it was merged into Kyundyade.

See also
 List of rural localities in the Sakha Republic

Notes

References

Rural localities in the Sakha Republic